Anthene liodes, the liodes hairtail, is a butterfly of the family Lycaenidae. It is found from Sierra Leone to Kenya, then to Malawi, Zimbabwe and Angola. It is rarely found in South Africa found from KwaZulu-Natal to Eswatini, Mpumalanga and the Limpopo Province. Its habitat is usually woodlands, forest-edge habitats and dense savannah.

The wingspan is 21–25 mm for males and 21–27 mm for females. Adults are on wing year-round, with a peak in summer.

The larvae feed on Mangifera (including M. indica), Combretum, Myrica and Allophylus species

References

Butterflies described in 1874
Anthene
Butterflies of Africa
Taxa named by William Chapman Hewitson